Three Waters may refer to:

 Three Waters reform programme, a restructuring programme in New Zealand
 Threewaters, a town in England
 Three Waters Mountain in Wyoming
 Meeting of Three Waters, a waterfall in Scotland